Elizabeth Fenwick Way (April 5, 1916 – November 20, 1996), who wrote as Elizabeth Fenwick and E. P. Fenwick, was an American mystery writer, novelist, and author of books for children. Her 1963 mystery novel The Make-Believe Man was nominated for an Edgar Allan Poe Award by the Mystery Writers of America.

In 1948, Way became friends with writer Flannery O'Connor while they were living at Yaddo, a writers' community in Saratoga Springs, New York. According to O'Connor biographer Melissa Simpson, O'Connor "...cultivated several enduring friendships while at Yaddo, the most notable being her friendship with Elizabeth Fenwick Way...". When O'Connor left Yaddo for New York City in 1949, Way helped her find an apartment.

Some of Way's manuscripts and papers are held by the Howard Gotlieb Archival Research Center at Boston University.

Critical reviews

Commenting in 1980 on Fenwick's crime fiction, reviewer Carol Cleveland said, "Elizabeth Fenwick's suspense novels are remarkable for the degree of horror they can extract from minimal materials."

In a 1963 review of new children's books, Jane C. Morse praised Fenwick's Cockleberry Castle, saying, ". . . in a story by a new writer in her first book for children Elizabeth Fenwick puts the climax at the right time and in the right place."

In 1968, Kirkus Reviews said of Goodbye, Aunt Elva  that it depicts "...the kind of quiet victimization, in old house slippers, which Miss Fenwick manages so well: not her best, but her next best is better than most."

Bibliography

Mystery novels
As E. P. Fenwick
 The Inconvenient Corpse (1943) 
 Murder in Haste (1944) 
 Two Names for Death (1945) 

As Elizabeth Fenwick
 Poor Harriet (1957) 
 A Long Way Down (1959) 
 A Friend of Mary Rose (1961) 
 A Night Run (1961) 
 The Silent Cousin (1962) 
 The Make-Believe Man (1963) 
 Disturbance on Berry Hill (1968) 
 Goodbye, Aunt Elva (1968) 
 Impeccable People (1971) 
 The Last of Lysandra (1973)

Novels
As Elizabeth Fenwick
 The Long Wing (1947) 
 Afterwards (1950) 
 Days of Plenty (1956)

Juvenile
As Elizabeth Fenwick
 Cockleberry Castle (1963) 
 The Passenger (1967)

References

1916 births
1996 deaths
20th-century American women writers
American children's writers
American crime fiction writers
Neurological disease deaths in Colorado
Deaths from Alzheimer's disease
Writers from St. Louis